Lukas Tyler Walton (born September 19, 1986) is an American billionaire heir. He is the grandson of Sam Walton, the founder of Walmart.

Early life and career
Lukas Walton is the only child of John T. Walton (1946–2005) and his wife Christy Walton. He grew up in National City, California, and Jackson Hole, Wyoming. His father, John T. Walton, died in a plane crash in 2005. Following his father's death, he moved with his mother to Jackson, Wyoming.

When he was three years old, Walton was diagnosed with a rare kidney cancer, and his mother attributed his recovery to a plant-based remedy from her garden.

He has a bachelor's degree in environmentally sustainable business from Colorado College, where he graduated in 2010.

He went on to work at True North Venture Partners.

Philanthropy
Walton works for the Walton Family Foundation. He is the environment program committee chair for the Walton Family Foundation.

Politics
In 2020, Walton gave $5,600 to the Biden campaign and $142,000 to the Democratic National Committee.

Personal life
As of 2022, Lukas Walton is ranked 106th in the Forbes annual list of the world's billionaires.

He lives in Jackson, Wyoming and Chicago. As of September 2020, he was listed as the richest person in the state of Illinois.

He is married to Samantha Walton, who is listed as the co-president with Lukas Walton in the Builders Initiative, which is a Walton family foundation.

References

1986 births
Living people
People from Chicago
People from Jackson, Wyoming
People from National City, California
Colorado College alumni
American billionaires
Lukas